Nogarole may refer to:

Nogarole Rocca, Italian municipality of the province of Verona 
Nogarole Vicentino, Italian municipality of the province of Vicenza